Rose is a 2019 Burmese drama television series. It was based on the popular eponymous novel written by Ma Sandar. It aired on MRTV-4, from August 15 to September 17, 2019, on Mondays to Fridays at 19:00 for 22 episodes.

Cast

Main
Sithu Win as Tin Maung Kyaw
Khay Sett Thwin as Hnin
Kaung Sett Naing as Ko Ko Maung, elder brother of Tin Maung Kyaw
Ye Aung as U Chan Thar, father of Zaw and Maw
Shin Mway La as Zaw
Wai Lar Ri as Maw

Supporting
Htet Myat as Aung Myo
Nay Yee as Ka Note
Ingyin Htoo as Yin Nan
Goon Pone Gyi as Kye Kye Ngwe
Khin Moht Moht Aye as Daw Daw Thet, stepmother of Hnin

References

Burmese television series
MRTV (TV network) original programming